The climate of Wales refers to the weather conditions prevailing in Wales in general or over a long period.

Wales has warmer temperatures throughout the year than Northern Ireland and Scotland and has milder winter minima than England, but cooler winter maxima than Northern Ireland. Wales is wetter throughout the year than Northern Ireland and England, but has fewer rainy days than Northern Ireland; meaning that rainfall tends to be more intense. Wales is also drier than Scotland in every month apart from May, June and December, and there are fewer days with rain than in Scotland. Sunshine totals throughout the year are more than that of Scotland and Northern Ireland, but less than that of neighbouring England. May is the sunniest month, averaging 186.8 hours.

Climate

Sunshine 
The south-western coast is the sunniest part of Wales, averaging over 1700 hours of sunshine annually, with Tenby, Pembrokeshire, its sunniest town. The dullest time of year is between November and January and the sunniest between May and August. The least sunny areas are the mountains, some parts of which average less than 1200 hours of sunshine annually.

Wind 
The prevailing wind is south-westerly. Coastal areas are the windiest, gales occur most often during winter, on average between 15 and 30 days each year, depending on location. Inland, gales average fewer than six days annually.

Daylight hours 
Wales experiences long summer days and short winter days result of northerly latitudes (between 53° 43′ N and 51° 38′ N). Aberystwyth, at the midpoint of the country's west coast, has nearly 17 hours of daylight at the summer solstice. Daylight at midwinter there falls to just over seven and a half hours.

Geographic variations 
The country's wide geographic variations cause localised differences in sunshine, rainfall and temperature. Average annual coastal temperatures reach  and in low lying inland areas,  lower. It becomes cooler at higher altitudes; annual temperatures decrease on average approximately  each  of altitude.

Temperature 
Temperatures in Wales remain higher than would otherwise be expected at its latitude because of the North Atlantic Drift, a branch of the Gulf Stream. The ocean current, bringing warmer water to northerly latitudes, has a similar effect on most of north-west Europe. As well as its influence on Wales' coastal areas, air warmed by the Gulf Stream blows further inland with the prevailing winds. At low elevations, summers tend to be warm and sunny. Winters tend to be fairly wet, but rainfall is rarely excessive and the temperature usually stays above freezing. Spring and autumn feel quite similar and the temperatures tend to stay above  – also the average annual daytime temperature.

Rainfall 
Rainfall patterns show significant variation. The further west, the higher the expected rainfall; up to 40 per cent more. At low elevations, rain is unpredictable at any time of year, although the showers tend to be shorter in summer. The uplands of Wales have most rain, normally more than 50 days of rain during the winter months (December to February), falling to around 35 rainy days during the summer months (June to August).

Snow 
The likelihood is that it will fall as sleet or snow when the temperature falls below  and snow tends to be lying on the ground there for an average of 30 days a year. Snow falls several times each winter in inland areas but is relatively uncommon around the coast.

Climate data for Wales

Climate chart 

This climate chart provides an overview of the climate in Wales during a year period. The letters in the top row stand for months: January, February, etc. The bars and numbers convey the following information: The blue bars represent the amount of precipitation (rain, snow etc.) that falls in each month. The blue numbers are the amount of precipitation in either millimeters (liters per square meter) or inches. The red numbers are the average daily high and low temperatures for each month, and the red bars represent the average daily temperature span for each month. The thin gray line is 0 °C or 32 °F, the point of freezing, for orientation.

Record temperatures for Wales 
Below is a list of record temperatures for Wales according to the UK Met Office.

See also

 Environment Wales
 Environmental issues in Wales
 Renewable energy in Wales

References 

Climate of Wales
Climate by country